Aylesham railway station is on the Dover branch of the Chatham Main Line in England, and serves the village of Aylesham, Kent.

The station and all trains that call are operated by Southeastern.

It was built by the Southern Railway and opened on 1 July 1928 to cater for the considerable increase in passenger traffic brought about by the development of the Kent coalfield. The main station buildings are on the London-bound side of the station.

The station booking office is staffed on Mondays to Saturdays mornings and a self-service ticket machine is located on the London-bound platform.

History
Opened by the Southern Railway the station passed to the Southern Region of British Railways on nationalisation in 1948.

When sectorisation was introduced in the 1980s, the station was served by Network SouthEast until the privatisation of British Rail.

Services
All services at Aylesham are operated by Southeastern using  EMUs.

The typical off-peak service in trains per hour is:
 1 tph to  via 
 1 tph to 

During the peak hours, the service is increased to 2 tph.

References
References

Sources

External links

 Station on navigable O.S. map

Dover District
Railway stations in Kent
DfT Category E stations
Former Southern Railway (UK) stations
Railway stations in Great Britain opened in 1928
Railway stations served by Southeastern